David Holden (1924–1977) was a writer, journalist, and broadcaster, best known as the Chief Foreign Correspondent for The Sunday Times, specialising in Middle-Eastern affairs, where he had been since 1965. He was murdered in execution style in Cairo, Egypt.

His editor, Harold Evans, used three of his top journalists to conduct a six-month investigation, including several trips to the Middle East and one to the United States. The murder was never solved and no political group claimed responsibility. In Evans' autobiography, My Paper Chase (2009), he covered the murder of Holden and investigation.

Early life and education
Born in Sunderland (Tyne and Wear), Northeast England, he was educated at Great Ayton Friends' School in North Yorkshire, Emmanuel College, Cambridge, and Northwestern University, Evanston, Illinois (USA).

Career
After a three-year stint as a schoolteacher in Scotland, Holden worked as a professional actor. He returned to North America, travelling as an odd-job man in the US and Mexico. In 1955, he was recruited as an assistant correspondent in Washington, DC by The Times (London).

Journalism
The following year, Holden transferred to the Middle East to cover the political and diplomatic crisis following the 1956 joint invasion of Egypt by Israel, France, and Britain.

As Middle East Correspondent for The Times, he travelled throughout the Arab World during the next four years, then was named roving correspondent. In 1961 he joined The Guardian with the same wide brief. In 1965 he became Chief Foreign Correspondent of The Sunday Times and was serving in that position at the time of his death.  
	
In addition to his journalism, Holden wrote books: Farewell to Arabia (1966) and Greece Without Columns (1972).

He began working on a third book, The House of Saud about the Saudi royal family, in 1976. Before he could finish it; he was killed. The book had to be completed later by two other Middle-Eastern specialists, Richard Johns and James Buchan, both then with the Financial Times.

Homicide 
When the peace talks were announced, Holden came off a leave to attend them. He flew into Cairo several days earlier to cover the peace talks being initiated by Anwar Sadat, the Egyptian president, with Israel. Since the Six-Day War in 1967 it had occupied the Egyptian province of Sinai. Sadat was acting independently from the rest of the Arab world.

Since 1971, Sadat had been reducing relations with the USSR and had closed the cultural centres of the Soviet Union, East Germany, Hungary and Czechoslovakia. He called a conference to be convened at Mena House in Cairo from 14 December onward, for the meetings which would bring Israeli officials and their entourages, including security personnel, officially into an Arab country for the first time.

Holden decided to pay a quick visit to Israel, which still had no diplomatic or commercial relations with any Arab country. He flew to Amman. As Time magazine reported:  "Holden told friends in Amman that he was going to make a detour to Jerusalem on his way  [back] to Cairo. 'Haven't been there for years,' he said. 'I guess they consider me public enemy No. 1'.

After Holden failed to contact his home office as agreed from the hotel where he had booked to stay, The Sunday Times became concerned. His body was found beside a road near a building site not far from the airport, “stripped of all means of identification”, so it was taken to the Cairo morgue. Officials finally discovered and claimed it on 10 December.

He was killed with a single shot, close range. Three cars were found to be associated with the crime, all white Fiats: the car in which the murder took place, one which held his briefcase, identification and luggage, and another with papers. They were found abandoned in different parts of Cairo.

Police initially thought he had been killed by an illegal taxi driver. There was speculation that the killing was related to the peace talks, but no group took responsibility, which would usually be the case if it were meant as a protest or warning. At an early date, there was speculation that security forces might be involved.

The Sunday Times editor, Harold Evans, sent three of his own reporters to investigate, and they worked on the case for six months. Based on several pieces of information, such as learning that the CIA had a file on Holden and about contacts of his with CIA agents, the journalists made an unconfirmed conclusion that he had been a CIA agent. They also noted that his reporting in the 1970s on CIA involvement in Cuba and Chile downplayed its role.

"In 1988 the Sunday Times was told by a senior US diplomat in the Middle East that Holden had been killed on the orders of the CIA but it had been carried out by Egyptian agents." The question remains open as to why he was killed.

Bibliography
Harold Evans, My Paper Chase (2009), serialised in The Sunday Times
Moscrop, Andrew. The Camel's Neighbour : Travel and Travellers in Yemen. Oxford, 2020. Pages 219 to 241.

References

Sources
 1. Holden's years there were 1939–1941. Founded in 1841, the school was dissolved in 1997. See Ayton Old Scholars' Association, Annual Report 2001, "News of Old Scholars," p. 3.
 2. For basic biographical information, see Richard Johns, "Author's Preface and Acknowledgments" in David Holden, Richard Johns, and James Buchan, The House of Saud: The  Rise  and Rule of the Most Powerful Dynasty in the Arab World, (London: Sidgwick and Jackson, 1981), pp. xi–xiii and the publisher's biographical sketch on the original dustjacket.
3. For a full and authoritative treatment of these developments as seen at first hand, see Ismail Fahmi, Negotiating for Peace in the Middle East (London and Canberra: Croom Helm, 1983), pp. 233–301. Fahmi, Egypt's foreign minister, had resigned on 17 November.
4. See Moustafa Ahmed, ed., Egypt in the 20th Century: Chronology of Major Events. (London: MegaZette Press, 2003), pp. 304–305.
5.  "Press: Murder in Cairo," Time, 26 December 1977.
6.  Not five or six hours later, as claimed in some reports, which apparently confused the time of death with the time of the discovery of the body and its removal to the morgue. See [Humphrey Trevelyan] Lord Trevelyan, Foreword to David Holden, Richard Johns, and James Buchan, The House of Saud, p. v]. Trevelyan had known Holden since 1956, when he was ambassador to Egypt.
7.  Richard Johns, op. cit, p. xi. 
8. Desmond Stewart, another British journalist specialised in the Middle East, was poisoned in Cairo in 1981. Having apparently recovered there, he was then shipped off to England, where he mysteriously died. A biographer of Theodor Herzl and T. E. Lawrence, Stewart's book on the plight of the Palestinians, The Palestinians: Victims of Expediency (London, Melbourne, New York: Quartet, 1982) was published posthumously and nearly all copies have completely disappeared.
9. Similar operations on Egyptian soil have been the assassination of Lord Moyne in Cairo on 6 November 1944 by members of Lehi, the so-called Stern Gang (see Bowyer Bell, Terror Out of Zion: Irgun Zvai Leumi, LEHI, and the Palestine underground, 1929–1949. [New York: St Martin's Press], p. 92) and the bombings of British and American facilities in Alexandria carried out ten years later as part of an officially conducted "Operation Susannah," which was at the centre of the so-called Lavon Affair. Members of the Stern Gang murdered Count Folke Bernadotte, the UN mediator, in Jerusalem on 17 September 1948, carrying out a plan authorised by a three-man committee that included Yitzhak Shamir, a future Israeli prime minister.  In 1975 the remains of the murderers of Lord Moyne were sent from Egypt to Israel, where they received a hero's burial. 
10.  See, for example, the Australian Associated Press-Reuters story "Cairo Inquiry into Killing," The Sydney Morning Herald, Tuesday 13 December 1977. p. 4. 
11. Hirst's analysis of Sadat's reign is contained in the book he wrote with fellow correspondent Irene Beeson, Sadat (London: Faber and Faber, 1981).
12. Copies of Holden's book were in fact presented as gifts to various Western individuals,  agencies, and organisations by members of the Saud family. The copy used in preparing this memoir, for example, as testified by a book-plate, was a gift to the Arab-British Centre in London from Prince Turki ibn Muhammad ibn Fahd ibn 'Abd-ul-Aziz al-Saud, one of the more prominent princes, in June 1983.

1924 births
1977 deaths
1977 murders in Egypt
People from Sunderland
Writers from Tyne and Wear
English male journalists
English biographers
British people murdered abroad
Deaths by firearm in Egypt
Journalists killed in Egypt
People murdered in Egypt
Assassinated British journalists
Alumni of Emmanuel College, Cambridge
20th-century biographers
20th-century English male writers
Northwestern University alumni
British expatriates in the United States
Male biographers
British expatriates in Mexico
British expatriates in Egypt